Alan Ko, also known as Alan Kuo or Alan Ke, is a Taiwanese singer and actor.

Career 
Ko is the son of the late Taiwanese stuntman/actor, Blackie Ko Shou Liang and his wife Sung Lai Wah. For his father, he had written two songs, each in one of his albums in the same number of track. "Wake Up" and "I Miss You", these two songs shows his relationship with his father, how much his father had changed him. Before actually starting to receive the chance to release his first album he went through a lot of hard work.

Ko was initially a guitarist who had minimal experience writing songs and lyrics. He first entered Alpha Music in 1999, where he worked as a host under Jacky Wu's branch of artists before quitting in 2002. Ko was eventually mentored as he befriended Jay Chou, who told him that he should know how to write his own songs, so that people would want to listen to his music. Ko began to write more as a lyricist, including styles of R&B, rock music, rap, pop music and various genres. Ko's music director required him to edit and edit his songs, every year, every month, every week, and every day. Ko pushed harder on working on his songs for perfection despite his courage being challenged. Within six years of preparation, Ko eventually selected the best 12 songs for all the people anticipating for his music.

Ko's father died of an accident in 2003, but it did not stop him nor did he wanted to be like his father, and insisted on going his own route. Prior to his death, his father told Ko "to achieve success and not let him down, or else he would not acknowledge Ko as a son". On August 19, 2005, Alan Kuo's first album came out with 12 songs and gained heavy support by famous Hong Kong singer/actor, Jacky Cheung.

Since then, Ko acted in various shows and films.

Personal life 
In 2007, Ko changed his Chinese name from 柯有倫 to 柯有綸 even though he switched his name back to 柯有倫 again in 2011.

In 2018, he married his wife Donna (朵拉), whom he has known for 20 years. The couple were married in Hong Kong. The couple also have a daughter, born in August 2020.

Discography

Albums

Filmography

TV series 
 K.O.3an Guo
 Sonic Youth
 Y2K+01
 Mars
 Sweet Relationship (2007)
 OCTB (2017)

Movies 
 The Legend Of Wisely (1987)
 Life Express (2002)
 Happy Feet (2006) (Dub)
 Fate (2008)
 L-O-V-E (2009)
 Goodbye May (2011)
 Din Tao: Leader of the Parade (2012)
 Fearless (2012)
 Hakka Love You (2012)
 The Rooftop (2013)
 Rhythm of the Rain (2013)
 Rookie (2015)
 My Egg Boy (2016)

Collaborations 
 "Celebrate the Day (Mandarin version)" (榮耀的一天) with Yida Huang
 "Carry On" (扛得住) with Alien Huang and Bobby Dou from Alien's final studio album Plan B (Rock Records)

References

External links 
 ALAN in SONY MUSIC
 Alan Kuo in YesAsia
 Alan's Yahoo Blog

1981 births
Living people
Taiwanese singer-songwriters
Taiwanese male film actors
Taiwanese male television actors
Taiwanese male voice actors
Musicians from Taipei
Male actors from Taipei
21st-century Taiwanese male actors
21st-century Taiwanese  male singers